Barne is a surname. Notable people with the surname include:

Frederick Barne (1801–1886), English landowner and politician
Frederick St John Newdigate Barne (1842–1898), British army officer and politician
George Barne (bishop) (1879–1954), Jamaican-born English cricketer and Anglican bishop
George Barne II (died 1558), Sheriff of London and Lord Mayor of London
George Barne III (died 1593), Sheriff of London and Lord Mayor of London
Kitty Barne (1883–1961), English writer and screenwriter
Miles Barne (politician born 1718), MP for Dunwich 1747–54 and 1762–77
Miles Barne (politician born 1746), MP for Dunwich 1791–96
 Michael Barne (politician) (1759–1837), English soldier and politician, MP for Dunwich 1812–30
Michael Barne (1877–1961), English explorer
 Snowdon Barne (1756–1825), English barrister and politician
William Barne (died 1562), English politician

See also
Barne Barton, area of Plymouth, Devon, England
Barne Inlet, inlet of Antarctica
Barne Glacier, glacier of Antarctica
Cape Barne, headland of Antarctica
Barnes (disambiguation)